

References

Parks and open spaces in Berkshire
Berkshire
Lists of buildings and structures in Berkshire